"Stand on the Horizon" is a song by Scottish indie rock band Franz Ferdinand. It was released as the sixth single from the band's fourth studio album, Right Thoughts, Right Words, Right Action, on 28 July 2014. The song was written by Alex Kapranos and Nick McCarthy, recorded during 2013, and produced by Kapranos and Norwegian DJ Todd Terje. The music video for the song was released on 3 August 2014, was directed by Karan Kandhari, and was posted on the band's Vevo channel on YouTube.

Composition
"Stand on the Horizon" features indie rock and disco-punk.<ref>{{cite news | url=http://www.avclub.com/review/franz-ferdinand-emright-thoughts-right-words-right-102091 | title=Review: Franz Ferdinand - '"Right Thoughts, Right Words, Right Action | newspaper=The A.V. Club | date=27 August 2013 | accessdate=9 March 2015 | author=Zaleski, Annie}}</ref> The song was written by Alex Kapranos and Nick McCarthy and produced by Kapranos and Norwegian DJ Todd Terje. The song was labeled by Kapranos as something neither Franz Ferdinand or Terje have done before. He also called the ending of the song "a beautiful, uplifting piece of music". The song is sampled over the opening credits to the U.S./Canadian situation comedy Loudermilk''.

Track listing

Personnel
Personnel adapted from the album's liner notes

Franz Ferdinand
Alex Kapranos – lead vocals, guitar, composing, mixing, pre-production, and production
Nick McCarthy – backing vocals, rhythm guitar, and keyboards
Bob Hardy – bass guitar
Paul Thomson – drums

Production personnel
Ch4in$ - pre-production
Owen Pallett - strings and string arrangement
Mark Ralph - engineering and mixing
Todd Terje - engineering, mixing, and production

Charts

Release history

References

2013 songs
2014 singles
Franz Ferdinand (band) songs
Songs written by Alex Kapranos
Songs written by Nick McCarthy
Domino Recording Company singles